The Dutton & Michaels photographic studio was a photography partnership between Sylvester Dutton, an American from Maine, and someone named Michaels (possibly Vince Michaels), which was based in Canton (now Guangzhou), China, in the mid-1860s.

References

Photographic studios
Architectural photographers
19th-century American photographers
Photography in China
Guangzhou